Drummond Cove is a coastal town located  north of Geraldton, Western Australia in the local government area of the City of Greater Geraldton. The locality was gazetted in 1985.

History 
The area at Drummond Cove was home to Aboriginal people and is part of the Yamatji Country of Western Australia. The bay was initially known as Smugglers Cove due to its use for the illegal export of sandalwood, shipped from there to evade the Government royalty of £1/10/0 per ton.

In 1851 William Burges, Resident Magistrate at Champion Bay (Geraldton), promoted Drummond Cove as a port because of the availability of water, access to inland towns and stable foreshore. However the shallow cove was rocky and unsuitable for shipping, and Geraldton was chosen as the main settlement.  Also in 1851, John Nicol Drummond, who was First Constable of Native Police of Western Australia in the Champion Bay area, acquired land next to the police reserve in the area. Over the next few years, he acquired additional adjoining land.

On 19 February 1852 he  married Mary Shaw of Belvoir, Upper Swan and subsequently built a stone and thatch cottage where they lived for a number of years. The bay was renamed Drummond's Cove.

In the 1930s, Macedonian families moved into the area and  established tomato gardens along the side of Chapman Road

In the early 1940s, cray fishermen began arriving for the fishing season. They built shacks overlooking the cove.

In 1950, the Upper Chapman Road Board resumed 30 acres of land surrounding the cove from White Peak Station, as a beach camping site. The board created 24 cottage blocks along the beachfront.  The blocks were leased and by 1964, when the Shire of Greenough acquired the land a small community had been established. Leases were extended from 3 years, to 10 years, to 21 years, promoting further development.

Eventually, most leaseholders were granted freehold title to the land. In 2016, all land between Whitehill Road and the shore reverted to the Crown as "foreshore reserve" and all houses there were demolished or moved.

Demographics

In 2016 Drummond Cove residents had a median age of 34 and a median weekly income of A$849 (compared with the Western Australian median of A$724 per week). The population of Drummond Cove was predominantly Australian-born - 79.5% well above the state figure of 60.3%. 3.7% were born in England. 1.4% reported one or more parents of Italian birth.

References 

Suburbs of Geraldton
Coastal towns in Western Australia